Thecla pavo, the peacock hairstreak, is a small butterfly found in India that belongs to the lycaenids or blues family.

Range
The butterfly occurs in Indian Himalayas from Bhutan to Nagaland.

See also
List of butterflies of India (Lycaenidae)

Cited references

References
  
 
 
 

Thecla (butterfly)
Butterflies of Asia
Butterflies described in 1887